The content of this article is based on the Census of India, 2011:
 Cities with 1 lakh (100,000) and above population
 Census India

Note: The list includes the city municipal limits, but not urban agglomeration or Municipalities.

Andhra Pradesh

Arunachal Pradesh

Assam

Bihar

Chhattisgarh

Goa

Gujarat

Haryana

Himachal Pradesh

Jharkhand

Karnataka

Kerala

Madhya Pradesh

Maharashtra

Manipur

Meghalaya

Mizoram

Nagaland

Odisha

Punjab

Rajasthan

Sikkim

Tamil Nadu

Telangana

Tripura

Uttar Pradesh

Uttarakhand

West Bengal

Andaman and Nicobar Islands

Chandigarh

Dadra and Nagar Haveli and Daman and Diu

Delhi

Jammu and Kashmir

Ladakh

Lakshadweep

Puducherry

References

External links

Local government-related lists
India government-related lists